The Ust-Danube Seaport is a state-owned enterprise of the Ukrainian transport system, located in the southern part of the Zhebriyansʹka Bay of the Black Sea and at the mouth of the Ochakiv estuary of the Danube Delta. The port administration is located in Vylkove, Odesa Oblast. According to the Law of Ukraine "On Seaports of Ukraine," the functions of the seaport administration are performed by the Ust-Danube branch of the state enterprise of the Ukrainian Sea Ports Authority.

See also

List of ports in Ukraine
Transport in Ukraine

References

Buildings and structures in Odesa Oblast
Ports of Odesa Oblast
Ukrainian Sea Ports Authority